The Highlands is a city in Reno County, Kansas, United States.  As of the 2020 census, the population of the city was 349.  It is located north of the city of Hutchinson.

History
The Highlands was incorporated from 21 subdivisions surrounding the Crazy Horse Golf Club in 2017, in order to provide tax dollars for deteriorating roads.  The Highlands was the first new city in Reno County to be incorporated in 65 years since the incorporation of Willowbrook.

Geography
The Highlands is located at  (38.1622835, -97.9466114).

Demographics

Education
The community is served by Nickerson–South Hutchinson USD 309 public school district.

See also
 Highland, Kansas

References

Further reading

External links
 The Highlands - Directory of Public Officials
 Reno County maps: Current, Historic, KDOT

Cities in Reno County, Kansas
Cities in Kansas
2017 establishments in Kansas